Babu Bangaram is a 2016 Indian Telugu-language action comedy film produced by Suryadevara Naga Vamsi, P. D. V. Prasad on Sitara Entertainments banner and directed by Maruthi. Starring Venkatesh and Nayanthara, it has music composed by Ghibran.

The film was launched on 16 December 2015 in Hyderabad and principal photography began the following day. The first look poster of the film was released on 7 April 2016 on the eve of Ugadi.

Babu Bangaram obtained a U/A from the censor board. The film had a worldwide release on 12 August 2016 amid much fanfare. The film was simultaneously released with a Tamil dubbed version titled Selvi.

Plot
ACP Krishna is a kind-hearted man, who is even empathetic towards criminals. Sailaja is the daughter of an accused person named Sastry for murder, wanted by the police and hiding somewhere. Sailaja runs her family with a catering business and is struggling with her four sisters and grandmother on one side. On another side, she is facing an existential threat from Mallesh Yadav, a big goon who is a henchman of MLA Puchappa, and who both are after Sastry. One more thing that bothers her is Battayi Babji, her maternal uncle's son who pesters her to marry him. Krishna meets Sailaja when she is depressed. The sympathy inside him works out, and he falls in love with her at first sight.

Afterward, he learns about her problems and the fact that Sailaja hates the police. Because of this, he hides his identity, targets Babji, traps him with some comic tricks, introduces himself to Sailaja as a common man with Babji's help, and starts helping her and her family. In this process, they develop a bond, and Sailaja also starts loving him. However, Krishna's real agenda is completely different. He has been appointed by the commissioner to apprehend Sailaja's father Sastry. When Sailaja's grandmother collapses from a heart attack and wants to see her son Sastry, Krishna forces Sailaja to call her father. By giving an assurance, he makes her do so and Sastry visits the hospital. When Krishna tries to arrest him, he listens to the good impression that Sailaja and her family are having on him, so he is not able to arrest him.

Suddenly a CI, who is an assistant to Krishna, enters the scene, surrounds Sastry, and reveals the entire truth regarding Krishna. Sastry escapes but is suddenly attacked by goons of Puchappa and Mallesh. He is seriously injured and goes into a coma. Krishna protects him and joins in the hospital, but when Sailaja discovers Krishna's real motive and they breakup. Soon after, Krishna begins the investigation to explore the hidden truth in which he learns that Sastry is an Income tax officer. In a raid at Puchappa's house, he and his superior officer get a pendrive, which contains Puchappa's extramartial affair with Mallesh's wife and their photos, along with Mallesh's secrets The superior officer tries to make a deal with Mallesh. Knowing this, Sastry keeps the pen drive under wraps. Because of this, Puchappa and Mallesh kill the superior officer, put the blame on Sastry, and they are after the pen drive and his family. Krishna sends the photos of Puchappa and Mallesh's wife to Mallesh. Malkesh catches Puchappa and is about to kill him, but Krishna arrives and arrests them. Sastry is proved innocent and recovers from a coma where Krishna reunites with Sailaja.

Cast

 Venkatesh as ACP Krishna aka Babu Bangaram
 Nayanthara as Sailaja
 Sampath Raj as Mallesh Yadav
 Posani Krishna Murali as MLA Puchappa
 Brahmanandam as Magic Mangamma
 Murali Sharma as Commissioner
 Jayaprakash as Sastry
 Vennela Kishore as SI Kishore
 Brahmaji as CI
 Rajitha as Sailaja's mother
 Sowcar Janaki as Sailaja's grandmother  
 Prudhviraj as Battayi Babji
 Mamilla Shailaja Priya as Mallesh Yadav's wife 
 Fish Venkat as Puchappa's henchmen
 Raghu Babu
 Ananth Babu 
 Mast Ali
 Raja Ravindra as Inspector
 Prabhas Sreenu as Thief
 Gundu Sudharshan as Priest
 Giridhar as Constable
 Aravind as Mallesh Yadav's goon
 Jabardast Chandra as himself
 Meena
 Pavala Shymala 
 Ragini
 Venu
 Nik Suler as a background dancer
 Sonam Bajwa as Special appearance in a title song

Soundtrack

The music was composed by Ghibran. It was released by Aditya music company. The audio launch was held in Hyderabad on 24 July 2016. Top industry celebrities like Dasari Narayana Rao, Nani, Lavanya Tripathi etc., have attended the function.

Original

Tamil

Release
12 August 2016 was announced as the worldwide release date.   In 2017, it was dubbed into Hindi as Revolver Raja.

Reception
The film has opened to some decent reviews all over. Noted website, 123telugu has rated the film 3.25 stars and quoted that "Venkatesh is the heart of the film which is a complete time pass family entertainer".

Box office
Babu Bangaram collected approximately 177,045 from 97 screens at the U.S. box office in the premiere shows on Thursday. This is the highest collection for a movie featuring Venkatesh and Babu Bangaram has become the biggest opener for him. The movie has shattered the record of Race Gurram, which collected 102,782 at the U.S. premieres. Its collection is on par with that of Sarrainodu, which collected 190,679 from 95 locations at paid preview shows in the U.S.

References

External links
 

2016 films
2010s Telugu-language films
Indian action comedy films
Films scored by Mohamaad Ghibran
2016 masala films
Films shot in Telangana
Fictional portrayals of the Telangana Police
2016 action comedy films
Films shot in Slovenia